Dubnica nad Váhom (Slovak before 1927: Dubnica, before 1899 Dubnic(z)) is a town in the Ilava District, Trenčín Region in Slovakia.

Geography
It is located on the Váh river, in the Ilava Basin, between the White Carpathians and Strážovské vrchy mountains, at an altitude of 242 metres. The town's cadastral area is composed of Dubnica and "city part" Prejta, annexed in 1973.

History
Traces of settlement in the place of today's town are from the Stone Age. The first written mention about Dubnica nad Váhom was in 1193 as Dubnicza. Sometime in the 15th century the village passed to the rule of the Trenčín Castle. After incorporation into Czechoslovakia, construction of a munition factory was negotiated in 1928 and built in 1936.

During the Second World War, a Roma concentration camp was set up in the town. At its height, the camp housed more than 700 Roma prisoners, most of whom had been used as slave labour in the nearby factory and to build a dam on the River Vah. During January 1945 several inmates and one guard fell ill with typhus. On February 23, 1945 the inmates were taken out and murdered to stop the spread of Typhus. This was among the largest killing of Roma in Slovakia during the war. 

During the Communist Czechoslovakia, it was one of the biggest arms producers in the whole country. After the Velvet Revolution in 1989, the factory was shut down and only fragments are left now.

Demographics
According to the 2001 census, the town had 25,995 inhabitants. 96.6% of inhabitants were Slovaks, 1.4% Czechs and 0.2% Roma and 0.2 Hungarians. The religious make-up was 76.7% Roman Catholics, 16.4% people with no religious affiliation, and 2.5% Lutherans.

Notable people
Pavol Demitra, ice hockey player
Tomáš Tatar, ice hockey player
Martin Valjent, footballer

Twin towns — sister cities

Dubnica nad Váhom is twinned with:
 Vác, Hungary
 Zawadzkie, Poland
 Otrokovice, Czech Republic
 Yaroslavl, Russia

See also
FK ZTS Dubnica
 List of municipalities and towns in Slovakia

References

Genealogical resources

The records for genealogical research are available at the state archive "Statny Archiv in Bratislava, Bytca, Slovakia"

 Roman Catholic church records (births/marriages/deaths): 1667-1895 (parish A)
 Lutheran church records (births/marriages/deaths): 1783-1895 (parish B)

External links

big town and surrounding photogallery
Official municipal website
Surnames of living people in Dubnica nad Vahom
Slovak Wastewater Treatment Plants which are sold all over Europe - Aquatec VFL

Cities and towns in Slovakia